is a train station located in Kurume, Fukuoka.

Lines
Nishi-Nippon Railroad
Amagi Line

Platforms

Adjacent stations

Surrounding area 
 Miyanojin Elementary School
 Miyanojin Junior High School
 Chitose Nursery
 Koga Hospital 21 
 Kurumetaisha Post Office
 JA Kurume Hokubu Branch

Railway stations in Fukuoka Prefecture
Railway stations in Japan opened in 1915